Rogachevo (recorded in various sources as Belushya, Rogachvo, or Rogatschovo) is a military air base on Novaya Zemlya, Russia located near the settlement of Rogachevo, 9 km northeast of Belushya Guba.  It was originally used as a staging base for intercontinental Long Range Aviation bomber flights (as a so-called 'bounce' airdrome). The base developed an interceptor role during the 1960s, partly to deter Lockheed SR-71 Blackbird operations in the Arctic region.

Rogachevo's primary operating unit is the 641 Gv IAP (641st Guards Interceptor Aviation Regiment).  It used Yakovlev Yak-28P (NATO: Firebar) aircraft, then received the Sukhoi Su-27 (NATO: Flanker) in 1985.  It is possible that in 1993 the unit may have dispersed to Afrikanda.  During the 1970s Tupolev Tu-28 (NATO: Fiddler) aircraft deployed frequently to Rogachevo from southern locales. Around 1990 Mikoyan MiG-31 (NATO: Foxhound) aircraft were deployed on occasion. Rogachevo was largely tied to its rear air station, Naryan-Mar Airport. In 2017, Russia finished new construction on the air base focused on updating technology and adding more social infrastructure.

History 
The name “Amderma-2” was assigned to the aerodrome during the Soviet period in order to observe the secrecy regime (in fact, the distance between Rogachevo and the village of Amderma is about 400 km).

From 1972 and at the aerodrome was based 641st Guards Fighter Aviation Regiment. From 1964 to 1988 and the regiment was armed with interceptor fighters Yak-28P, from 1987 and the rearmament of the new fighters began Su-27. In 1993, the regiment was relocated to the airfield Afrikanda, where it was combined with the 431st IAP. On their base was September 1, 1993, and the 470th Guards Vilna Order of Kutuzov Fighter Aviation Regiment was formed.

Destinations 
Until 2012, twice a week, the airline “Nordavia” operated a passenger flight Arkhangelsk (Talagi) - Amderma-2 - Arkhangelsk (Talagi) by plane An-24.

From November 5, 2015, Aviastar operates passenger and cargo flights along the route Arkhangelsk (Talagi) - Amderma-2 - Arkhangelsk (Talagi) on airplanes An-24 and An-26.

References

External links
Rogachevo website (Russian)

Airports in the Arctic
Russian Air Force bases
Soviet Air Defence Force bases
Novaya Zemlya
Populated places of Arctic Russia
Airports in Arkhangelsk Oblast

Soviet Long Range Aviation Arctic staging bases